Whiskey Creek Airport  is a public use airport located four nautical miles (7 km) east of the central business district of Silver City, in Grant County, New Mexico, United States.

Facilities and aircraft 
It has one runway designated 17/35 with an asphalt surface measuring 5,400 by 50 feet (1,646 x 15 m).

For the 12-month period ending April 12, 2010, the airport had 1,900 aircraft operations, an average of 158 per month: 58% general aviation and 42% air taxi. At that time there were 14 aircraft based at this airport: 43% single-engine, 50% multi-engine and 7% ultralight.

References

External links 
 Aerial image as of 21 September 1996 from USGS The National Map via MSR Maps
 

Airports in New Mexico
Transportation in Grant County, New Mexico
Buildings and structures in Grant County, New Mexico